Kagurazaka is a neighbourhood in Tokyo, near Iidabashi Station.

Kagurazaka can also refer to:
 Kagurazaka Station, a train station in Shinjuku, Tokyo
 Megumi Kagurazaka (born 1982), a Japanese actress and model
 Shinobu Kagurazaka, a character in Tenjho Tenge
Asuna Kagurazaka, a character in Negima!

Japanese-language surnames